The "workshop" of Pietro Bazzanti and Son is an historic landmark in Florence, art and culture heritage of the city. It took part in the role of "Fine Arts Trader" at the National Exposition of 1861 in Florence with several marble sculptures and various other works. The Bazzanti Marble Studio won the medal for the category "sculpture".

The Art Gallery in Florence 
The gallery was specialized in marble, alabaster and mosaics to satisfy customers consisting mainly of foreigners wishing to obtain perfect replicas of masterpieces admired during their trip.

The gallery on the Lungarno Corsini was a very popular place, and its works were carefully followed by those who were interested in art.

In 1822 Pietro Bazzanti took over the studio opened in 1815 by Luigi Bozzolini, the last descendant of a family of sculptors-decorators who had worked for the princes Corsini since '600, expanding the premises. The first evidence is provided by the major nineteenth-century city guides, which confirm that from the beginning the activity was allocated in the current Palazzo Corsini headquarters with large showrooms in front of the river and the sculpture studio was on the rear with access from via del Parione.

Pietro Bazzanti and Son 

Pietro Bazzanti born in 1775, lived in Via della Carraia, the current stretch of Borgo San Frediano from Via dei Serragli to Piazza San Frediano. He later moved into an apartment above the shop in Via del Parione at number 13.

It was formed in the sculpture studio of Bozzolini who took over, continuing the production of high quality artistic replicas of ancient statues: the Florentine population census of 1841 declares "...makes sculpture statues".

His son Niccolò Bazzanti, was a talented sculptor, born in 1802 and died in 1869. In 1822 he won an award for two sketches at the Academy of Fine Arts, where he graduated in 1824 starting its autonomous activities also continuing to work with his father Pietro. In 1840 he was nominated by the academy "Academician Professor of Sculpture in the First Class of the Arts and Design".

In 1834 he sculpts the plastic decoration of the palace that the publisher Vincenzo Batelli had built in 1831–1832 in via Sant'Egidio at number 12. The project involved the decoration of the facade with statues of the four seasons made from Bazzanti, all gone during the last war.

Niccolò was also commissioned in 1834 to sculpt, along with other artists, the series of 28 statues of the "Illustrious Tuscany Men" for the Uffizi Lodge.

The public subscription made to finance the transaction was not successful, so Niccolò Bazzanti made only the Orcagna statue. The famous beautiful marble replicas of the Venus of the Medici and of Apollino furnishing the palace Revoltella in Trieste , were also made by Niccolò Bazzanti.

In the '70s of '800 Niccolò gave the gallery his employee Thompson. In the mid-30s of the '900 Thompson gave in turn the gallery to his employee Biagioli.

In 1960 it was bought by the Marinelli family, who renewed sculpture Studio introducing, alongside the marbles, the famous bronzes produced by its own Ferdinando Marinelli Artistic Foundry. For the historical workshop meant a new course marked by a management able to control more strictly the artistic quality of the works and to organize assistance more widespread in the export. In addition, the nineteenth-century models inherited from the old owners were added to those of the great collection of plaster moulds of the Foundry.

See also 
 Florence
 Ferdinando Marinelli Artistic Foundry

Notes 

Art galleries established in 1822
1822 establishments in Italy
Art museums and galleries in Florence
Companies based in Florence